Kidnapped may refer to:

 subject to the crime of kidnapping

Literature
 Kidnapped (novel), an 1886 novel by Robert Louis Stevenson
 Kidnapped (comics), a 2007 graphic novel adaptation of R. L. Stevenson's novel by Alan Grant and Cam Kennedy 
 "Kidnapped" (short story), by Rudyard Kipling, 1887
 Kidnapped, a 2006 book series by Gordon Korman

Film
 Kidnapped (1917 film), a silent film based on R. L. Stevenson's novel 
 Kidnapped (1935 film), a Danish film
 Kidnapped (1938 film), based on R. L. Stevenson's novel 
 Kidnapped (1948 film), based on R. L. Stevenson's novel 
 Kidnapped (1960 film), a Disney film based on R. L. Stevenson's novel
 Kidnapped (1971 film), with Michael Caine, based on R. L. Stevenson's novel
 Kidnapped (1986 film), an animation, based on R. L. Stevenson's novel
 Kidnapped (1995 film), a TV film based on R. L. Stevenson's novel
 Kidnapped (2010 film), a Spanish film
 Kidnapped: The Hannah Anderson Story, a 2015 film about the Kidnapping of Hannah Anderson
 Kidnapped: In the Line of Duty, a 1995 American TV film

Television
 Kidnapped (American TV series), an NBC drama show
 Kidnapped (1978 miniseries), based on R. L. Stevenson's novel, starring David McCallum
 Kidnapped (2005 TV series), based on R. L. Stevenson's novel
 "Kidnapped!" (Jeeves and Wooster), a 1991 episode of the TV series
 "Kidnapped!", a 2006 episode of Frisky Dingo 
 "Kidnapped" (Dynasty)", a 1985 episode of the TV series

See also

 Kidnapping (disambiguation)
 Kidnap (disambiguation)
 Kidnapper (disambiguation)